Pterocladiophila is a genus of red algae, parasite of other red algae.

References

External links

Red algae genera
Gracilariales